, literally Roar at the Sun!, was a long-running prime-time television detective series in Japan, which ran from 1972 to 1986 for a total of 718 episodes. The lead star was Yujiro Ishihara. It also helped further the career of actors such as Yūsaku Matsuda and Kenichi Hagiwara as well as Hiroshi Katsuno and Masaya Oki. It was a police procedural set mostly in a police station. It was one of the most popular and iconic detective dramas in Japanese television history. A sequel was aired from 1986 to 1987, airing for 12 episodes.

Setting
The series takes place in the fictional Nanamagari police station in Shinjuku and portrays the investigations of Nanamagari's detective squad. Headed by Superintendent Shunsuke "Boss" Todo, it initially consists of Inspector Seiichi "Yama-san" Yamamura with Detectives Makoto "Gori-san" Ishizuka, Kimiyuki "His Highness" Shima, Taro "Chosan" Nozaki, and Policewoman Shinko "Shinko-san" Uchida. In the first episode they were joined by Detective Jun "Macaroni" Hayami, who later died in Episode 52. Macaroni was replaced by Jun "Jiipan" Shibata, who would also be killed in Episode 111, and starting a series tradition of having cast members killed off upon their actor's departure from the show. The drama recorded high audience rating, especially episodes which regular cast members were killed or died recorded high audience rating every time.

While the Nanamagari squad's usual jurisdiction encompasses Tokyo, sometimes they are assigned cases that take them to various locales across Japan, ranging from Okinawa and Sakurajima, to name a few. Other cases involved detectives going abroad to prosecute fugitives in Paris, Canada, Australia, and Hawaii.

Regulars

Semi Regulars
 Yoko Machida as Takako Yamamura (Wife of Seiichi Yamamura) (1972–78)
 Kin Sugai as Taki Shibata (Mother of Jun Shibata) (1973–74, 78, 85)
 Takuya Fujioka as Samejima (1973–86)
 Akihiko Hirata as Nishiyama (1973–83)

Taiyō ni Hoero! Part 2

References

Japanese drama television series
Japanese crime television series
1970s Japanese television series
Japanese police procedural television series
Detective television series
Japanese detective television drama series
Tokyo Metropolitan Police Department in fiction